Clinton is the name of some places in the U.S. state of Michigan:

 Clinton County, Michigan
 Clinton Township, Macomb County, Michigan
 Clinton, Lenawee County, Michigan, village
 Clinton Township, Lenawee County, Michigan
 Clinton Township, Oscoda County, Michigan